Tara, G! is a Philippine television miniseries directed by Catherine Camarillo. The series premiered from October 7 to December 9, 2022, on iWantTFC.

Synopsis
A traditional coffee farmer and his crew strive their hardest to help their elusive town of La Guerta reclaim its glory. But an eccentric city girl arrives and ruins everything, putting the friends back to square one.

Cast and characters

Main cast
Team WISE (Walang Iwanan Sa Ere)
Anthony Jennings as Rocky – the charming and dependable leader of the group. Continues his mother’s legacy of creating a ground coffee brand.
Daniela Stranner as Cars - the beautiful but narcissistic wealthy tourist from the city. A vlogger whose online reputation goes downhill after a video of her trends.
Kaori Oinuma as Legs – the smart and caring darling. Returns to La Guerta for the summer after studying in college in the city.
JC Alcantara as Dan – a handsome smooth talker who has a crush on Legs.
CJ Salonga as Smith – the academically intelligent member of the group.
Zach Castañeda as Will – the funny, go-to-guy and Smith's protective older brother.
Vivoree Esclito as Jengjeng – a sweet girl with big dreams. Plans to also attend college in the city.

Supporting cast
Dominic Ochoa as Gov. Miguel Sebastian - Governor of Tanaw and Rocky’s biological father.
Katya Santos as Celine – Dan’s mother and Gov. Sebastian's accomplice.
Jayson Gainza as Vito – Rocky’s adoptive father.
Arlene Muhlach as Jada – Will and Smith’s mother.
Lara Morena as Maya – Rocky’s late mother and Vito’s wife.
Denise Joaquin as Lea - Legs' mother and Arm's wife.
Karen Timbol as Gracia – Corrine and Cars’ mother.
Ingrid dela Paz as Corrine – manager of La Guerta’s local inn, and Cars’ older sister.
Marithez Samson
Bryan Sy as Arms – Legs’ father and Lea's husband.
Martha Comia as Jolens – Jengjeng’s mother. The situation in La Guerta causes her to consider working in the city for stable financial support for herself and her daughter.
Karl Gabriel as Marcus - Cars' ex-boyfriend.
Elyson de Dios

Episodes

Production

Background
The project was first announced at an iWantTFC event on December 10, 2021 with Jennings, Stranner, Oinuma, Alcantara, Salonga, Castañeda, and Esclito (who at that time was also slated to be part of the third season of Click, Like, Share and the second season of He's Into Her, both iWantTFC original shows) as the main cast members.

Marketing
Numerous teasers were released before the official trailer was released on September 7, 2022.

Music
Apart from the theme song "Tara, G!" by The Juans, the show's main cast members performed a rendition of the theme song. Also included in the series' soundtrack are "Pambihirang Harana" by Cesca, and "Hindi Pa Natin Alam" by Trisha Denise and Benedix Ramos.

Release

Broadcast
The series premiered on October 7 to December 9, 2022, on iWantTFC.

The series had its Philippine TV Premiere on April 9, 2023, on Yes Weekend Sunday primetime on Kapamilya Channel, Kapamilya Online Live and A2Z replacing Beach Bros. It also aired international via TFC (The Filipino Channel).

References

External links
 
 Tara, G! on iWantTFC

ABS-CBN drama series
IWantTFC original programming
2022 Philippine television series debuts
2022 Philippine television series endings
2022 web series debuts